This article lists described species of the family Asilidae start with letter R.

A
B
C
D
E
F
G
H
I
J
K
L
M
N
O
P
Q
S
T
U
V
W
X
Y
Z

List of Species

Genus Rachiopogon
 Rachiopogon grantii (Newman, 1857)
 Rachiopogon rubescens (White, 1914)

Genus Reburrus
 Reburrus aquilonius (Daniels, 1987)
 Reburrus bancrofti (Hardy, 1935)
 Reburrus calcedonicae (Daniels, 1987)
 Reburrus macquarti (Bigot, 1860)
 Reburrus peninsularis (Daniels, 1987)

Genus Regasilus
 Regasilus strigarius (Curran, 1931)

Genus Remotomyia
 Remotomyia albosetatus (Hull, 1967)
 Remotomyia brunales (Londt, 1983)
 Remotomyia longipalpus (Londt, 1983)
 Remotomyia penrithae (Londt, 1983)

Genus Rhabdogaster
 Rhabdogaster atropalpus (Londt, 2006)
 Rhabdogaster bicolor (Londt, 2006)
 Rhabdogaster charma (Londt, 2006)
 Rhabdogaster cornuta (Londt, 2006)
 Rhabdogaster cuthbertsoni (Londt, 2006)
 Rhabdogaster eremia (Londt, 2006)
 Rhabdogaster etheira (Londt, 2006)
 Rhabdogaster glabra (Londt, 2006)
 Rhabdogaster kalyptos (Londt, 2006)
 Rhabdogaster karoo (Londt, 2006)
 Rhabdogaster kosmos (Londt, 2006)
 Rhabdogaster lindneri (Londt, 2006)
 Rhabdogaster maculipennis (Engel, 1929)
 Rhabdogaster major (Oldroyd, 1970)
 Rhabdogaster melas (Londt, 2006)
 Rhabdogaster nitida (Hull, 1967)
 Rhabdogaster nuda (Loew, 1858)
 Rhabdogaster nyx (Londt, 2006)
 Rhabdogaster oresbios (Londt, 2006)
 Rhabdogaster oribi (Londt, 2006)
 Rhabdogaster pedion (Londt, 2006)
 Rhabdogaster pellos (Londt, 2006)
 Rhabdogaster poa (Londt, 2006)
 Rhabdogaster pulverulentus (Loew, 1858)
 Rhabdogaster quasinuda (Londt, 2006)
 Rhabdogaster rustica (Oldroyd, 1974)
 Rhabdogaster sinis (Londt, 2006)
 Rhabdogaster tanylabis (Londt, 2006)
 Rhabdogaster theroni (Londt, 2006)
 Rhabdogaster xanthokelis (Londt, 2006)
 Rhabdogaster yeti (Londt, 2006)
 Rhabdogaster zebra (Londt, 2006)
 Rhabdogaster zilla (Londt, 2006)
 Rhabdogaster zopheros (Londt, 2006)

Genus Rhacholaemus
 Rhacholaemus artigasi (Londt, 1999)
 Rhacholaemus fisheri (Londt, 1999)
 Rhacholaemus grimmi (Londt, 1999)
 Rhacholaemus hradskyi (Londt, 1999)
 Rhacholaemus josephi (Londt, 1999)
 Rhacholaemus nelsoni (Londt, 1999)
 Rhacholaemus tsacasi (Londt, 1999)

Genus Rhadinus
 Rhadinus amicorum (Richter, 1966)
 Rhadinus khargaiensis (Efflatoun, 1937)
 Rhadinus laurae (Bezzi, 1922)
 Rhadinus mesasiaticus (Lehr, 1958)
 Rhadinus salinus (Lehr, 1984)
 Rhadinus socotrae (Geller-Grimm, 2002)
 Rhadinus tewfiki (Efflatoun, 1937)
 Rhadinus turkestanicus (Lehr, 1984)
 Rhadinus ungulinus (Loew, 1856)

Genus Rhadiurgus
 Rhadiurgus variabilis (Zetterstedt, [183)

Genus Rhipidocephala
 Rhipidocephala caffra (Macquart, 1846)
 Rhipidocephala congoiensis (Oldroyd, 1966)
 Rhipidocephala distincta (Oldroyd, 1966)
 Rhipidocephala divestita (Oldroyd, 1966)
 Rhipidocephala doornensis (Oldroyd, 1966)
 Rhipidocephala engeli (Oldroyd, 1966)
 Rhipidocephala fimbriata (Oldroyd, 1966)
 Rhipidocephala flavipes (Hermann, 1926)
 Rhipidocephala fulva (Oldroyd, 1966)
 Rhipidocephala insonspicua (Oldroyd, 1966)
 Rhipidocephala lambertoni (Bromley, 1942)
 Rhipidocephala manicata (Oldroyd, 1966)
 Rhipidocephala mirabilis (Hull, 1958)
 Rhipidocephala morio (Hermann, 1926)
 Rhipidocephala obscurata (Oldroyd, 1966)
 Rhipidocephala quadrifaria (Hermann, 1926)
 Rhipidocephala scutata (Oldroyd, 1966)
 Rhipidocephala signata (Hermann, 1907)
 Rhipidocephala speciosa (Oldroyd, 1966)
 Rhipidocephala tenera (Oldroyd, 1966)
 Rhipidocephala thoracica (Engel, 1946)
 Rhipidocephala tigrina (Janssens, 1953)
 Rhipidocephala umbripennis (Loew, 1858)
 Rhipidocephala zumpti (Oldroyd, 1966)

Genus Rhopalogaster
 Rhopalogaster albidus (Scarbrough & Perez-Gelabert, 2006)
 Rhopalogaster araujoi (Carrera, 1952)
 Rhopalogaster aurifer (Hermann, 1912)
 Rhopalogaster bella (Bromley, 1929)
 Rhopalogaster lineata (Hermann, 1912)
 Rhopalogaster longicornis (Wiedemann, 1828)
 Rhopalogaster micronyx (Tomasovic, 2002)
 Rhopalogaster niphardis (Hermann, 1912)

Genus Robertomyia
 Robertomyia lavignei (Londt, 1990)

References 

 
Asilidae